El Goli Metro Station is a station on Tabriz Metro Line 1 next to Tabriz Southern Freeway and opened on 27 August 2015. It is the southeastern terminus of line 1 with a depot located next to the station. The next station to the North is Sahand Metro Station.

References

Tabriz Metro stations
Railway stations opened in 2015
2015 establishments in Iran